The 2018 Esso Cup was Canada's tenth national women's midget hockey championship, contested April 22–28, 2018 at Bridgewater, Nova Scotia.  This was the first time the championship has held in Nova Scotia.  The St. Alberta Slash of Alberta defeated the Saskatoon Stars 2–1 in the gold medal game to defend their national title.

Teams

Round robin

Playoffs

Statistics and game summaries available from HockeyCanada.com

Individual awards
 Most Valuable Player: Mackenna Parker (Saskatoon)
 Top Scorer: Mackenna Parker (Saskatoon)
 Top Forward: McKenzie Hewett (St. Albert)
 Top Defenceman: Ashley Messier (Saskatoon)
 Top Goaltender: Sarah Vanier (Lanaudière)
 Most Sportsmanlike Player: Paige Whaley (Brampton)

Road to the Esso Cup

Atlantic Region
Northern Selects advance by winning regional championship played March 29–April 1, 2018 at Mount Pearl, Newfoundland and Labrador.

Quebec
Pionnièeres le Lanaudière advance by winning LHFDQ Midget AAA championship played April 13–15, 2018.

Ontario
Brampton Canadettes advance by winning Ontario Women's Hockey Association championship played April 5–8, 2018 at Toronto, Ontario

Western Region
Saskatoon Stars advance by winning regional championship played April 6–7, 2018 at the T.G. Smith Centre in Steinbach, Manitoba.

Pacific Region
St. Albert advanced by winning regional championship played April 6–8, 2018 at Richmond, British Columbia.
Best-of-3 series

See also
 Esso Cup

References

External links
 2018 Esso Cup Home Page at HockeyCanada.com

Esso Cup
Esso Cup
Esso Cup 2018
April 2018 sports events in Canada